Vesalius is a lunar impact crater that lies on the far side of the Moon, less than 100 kilometers south of the lunar equator. It was named after Flemish anatomist and physician Andreas Vesalius. Just to the northwest is the slightly smaller crater Buisson. Farther to the west-southwest lies the prominent crater Einthoven.

The outer rim of Vesalius is generally circular but somewhat irregular. There is an outward bulge at the southern extremity and a low rim at the northern end. The inner wall displays some slight terracing. On the interior floor the central peak is offset to the north, suggesting that the crater was formed by a low-angle impact.

Satellite craters
By convention these features are identified on lunar maps by placing the letter on the side of the crater midpoint that is closest to Vesalius.

References

External links

Vesalius at The Moon Wiki

Impact craters on the Moon